
Ząbkowice Śląskie County is a unit of territorial administration and local government (powiat) in Lower Silesian Voivodeship, south-western Poland. It came into being on January 1, 1999, as a result of the Polish local government reforms passed in 1998. Its administrative seat is Ząbkowice Śląskie, and it also contains the towns of Ziębice, Złoty Stok and Bardo.

As of 2019 the total population of the county is 65,104. The most populated towns are Ząbkowice Śląskie with 15,004 inhabitants and Ziębice with 8,708 inhabitants.

Neighbouring counties
Ząbkowice Śląskie County is bordered by Kłodzko County to the south-west, Dzierżoniów County to the north-west, Strzelin County to the north-east and Nysa County to the east. It also borders the Czech Republic to the south.

Administrative division
The county is subdivided into seven gminas (four urban-rural and three rural). These are listed in the following table, in descending order of population.

References

 
Land counties of Lower Silesian Voivodeship